Creevekeeran Castle is a castle in County Armagh, Northern Ireland. It stands on a rocky outcrop but only the west wall, three stories high, remains. The castle is a Scheduled Historic Monument sited in the townland of Creevekeeran, in the Armagh City, Banbridge and Craigavon Borough Council area, at grid ref: H7847 3710.

References

See also 
List of castles in Northern Ireland

Castles in County Armagh
Ruined castles in Northern Ireland
Scheduled monuments in Northern Ireland